Lane Hall is a later 20th-century neoclassical building serving as the principal workplace and headquarters of the central administration of Bates College, located at 2 Andrews Road in Lewiston, Maine. It has been the principle administrative headquarters of every Bates president since Thomas Hedley Reynolds in 1964. Lane Hall was named after George Lane Jr., who served as treasurer of the college and secretary of the corporation.

The building name, Lane Hall is used to refer metonymically to the central administration of Bates College. The Board of Trustees combined with the office of the presidency create the Bates College Corporation, the highest level of authority for the college and its extended domains. The members of the Board of Trustees, central administration, and the president are afforded certain and selected powers, privileges, rights and immunities through the Laws of the President and Trustees of Bates College, the highest ranking document in the Corporation of Bates College.

The hall, often confused with the official residence of the president, provides no residential space for any executive offices. The president is afforded the President's House as an official residence. Lane Hall has no specific security detail but is under the security protection of the college's security units and the Lewiston Police Department.  Lane Hall is by Hathorn Hall to the south and to the North flanked by Parker Hall and Dana Chemistry Hall. It is adjacent to Pettigrew Hall and Pettengill Hall. Lane overlooks the Historic Quadrangle of the college and protrudes from Lake Andrews.

History 
1900 photo of Bates College featuring a newly constructed refurbished Historic Quad; protruding from the Hathon mound. The only buildings constructed at the time was the first academic building Hathorn Hall, and the first residential dormitory Parker Hall as well as Hedge Hall and Roger Williams Hall.

The founder of Bates College, Oren Burbank Cheney, began with the establishment of the Nichols Latin School, a collegiate preparatory school and the Cobb Divinity School which subsequently turned into the Maine State Seminary in 1852, later expanding to include liberal arts academics in 1855, making it one of the oldest liberal arts colleges in the United States. Cheney met with religious leaders in Topsham, Maine, to discuss the formation of a school that catered to Free Will Baptists and was based on principles of egalitarianism, liberty, and scholarship. He began his speech by stating:We do not propose an Academy [referring to Colby College (then Waterville Academy)], but a school of higher order, between a college [referring to Bowdoin College] and an Academy. We shall petition the state legislature to suitably endow, as well as incorporate, such an institution. We know our claim is good and intend openly and manfully and we trust in a Christian spirit to press it. If we fail next winter, we shall try another legislature. If we fail on a second trial, we shall try a third and a fourth.
The speech was well received and of the one required, twenty-four petitions were submitted to the Maine State Legislature. After minimal delay the charter was approved and appropriated with $15,000 for its conception. Benjamin Bates suggested to Cheney that the school be located in a more central part of Maine; Lewiston, Maine.

Construction 

The construction of the Lane Hall began with the laying of the cornerstone in 1963, although there was no formal ceremony. The principal façade of the Lane Hall, from the north, is of four floors and eleven bays. The ground floor is hidden by a raised carriage ramp and parapet, thus the façade appears to be of three floors. The central three bays are behind a prostyle portico (this was a later addition to the hall, built in 1970) serving, thanks to the carriage ramp, as a porte cochere. The hall's southern façade is a combination of the Palladian and neoclassical styles of architecture. It is of three floors, all visible. The ground floor is rusticated in the Palladian fashion. At the center of the façade is a neoclassical projecting triangular point of four bays. The point is flanked by two bays, the windows of which, as on the north façade, have alternating segmented and pointed pediments at first-floor level. The bows cover two staircase levels leading to a colonnaded loggia, next to Pettengill Hall. Lane Hall was constructed at a totaled cost of $630,000 ($4.8 million in 2016 U.S. dollars.)

Administration

Past presidents 
There have been eight presidents of Bates College, and one interim president.

Trustees of the college 
The college's Board of Fellows and Board of Overseers combined to create a united Board of Trustees featuring alumni, and accomplished members of society associated with Bates. The President and Board of Trustees of Bates College are afforded certain and selective rights that they are free to exercise in their official capacity. The property and government has historically been vested in its founder, and in his each President thereafter, including each of the following groups by ruling of the Laws of the President and Trustees of Bates College. The Laws of the President and Trustees of Bates College ensures the following:

The number of active members on the Board of Trustees is constitutionally set to be barred from exceeding a maximum of forty people with a minimum set at three members. When the allowed and mandated amount is reached only then can the Board of Trustees establish their quorum. The members are directly responsible for the election and eventual appointment of a Chairperson of the Board, Vice-Chairperson of the Board and a Secretary of the Board. With the aforementioned completed, the Board of Trustees may pursue the nomination, confirmation, and appointment of new members. All members of the Board of Trustees have a good standing term limit of up to five years, with a maximum of one selection. Although a rarity, a Trustee may serve for longer than ten years (or two terms of five years each) and may even serve at the incumbent president's pleasure. In order for such a status to be reached the Trustee must be appointed by the Executive Committee, and must be confirmed by two-thirds majority vote by the entire Board of Trustees. Only the President of the College and the Chairperson of the Board of Trustees may convene a meeting unprompted and unscheduled in the event of a confirmed emergency.The Board of Trustees may convene independently of the Corporation, that is to say, the office of the presidency and central administration to discuss sensitive or legally personal matters effecting the welfare of the college or its administration. Independent meetings may choose to bar the president or any member of the central administration from attending. An age limit of seventy years old is set for each and every Trustee unless one has been selected to serve at the incumbent president's pleasure.

The Board of Trustees is to elect a Treasurer of the Board of Trustees, who is to also serve as the Treasurer of the Corporation. This office is separate and distinctive from the central administration's Treasurer and Vice President for Finance and Administration. More specifically the Corporation's Treasurer is directly responsible for its "stocks, bonds, debentures, notes and other such instruments".

Due to the provisions of Title 13-B of the Maine Revised Statutes, any member of the Corporation of Bates College, including the president and trustees, in good faith and standing, has totaled immunity from all financial and economic expenses through the charter's indemnification policy. Enacted only when directly protecting, securing or promoting the overall welfare of the College.

The Board of Trustees establish the numerous Committees to secure the administration and wellbeing of the College. The Committee on Academic Affairs was established to oversee the College's athletic program and the academic activities and meet with the Faculty's Committee on Faculty Governance to discuss and promote the academic program of the college. The Committee on Admissions and Financial Aid was created to reviews policies and decides the direction for new admissions standards.

Executive committee 

The Board of Trustees are constitutionally required to elect an Executive Committee, that features the President of the College and the Chairperson of the Board of Trustees, and no less than five members of the Board of Trustees. The committee is directly responsible for the general administration of the college and its domains. The Chairman of the Board of Trustees is to also be appointed as the Chairman of the Bates College Corporation and to serve as the Chief Council to the President of Bates College.

Presidency of the college 
The President of Bates College is the appointed Head of the College, as well as the principal securer, principal academic, Chief Executive Officer of the Corporation, and the ex officio President of the Board of Trustees. Lane Hall serves as the principal workplace and headquarters of the president's central administration.

Barring the specifications of the Board of Trustees, the president has full and final authority and responsibility for all components of Bates including the academics, operations, and finances. The president is de facto the highest ranking academic official of ten separate functions including, the Board of Trustees (both active and honorary), Departments of Student Affairs, Finance, Admissions, Communications, Faculty, Library Services, College Advancement and the treasury. Although not the highest-ranking officer within the departments, the president maintains substantial influence (should they choose to exercise the right) over the operational capabilities of such departments. The president is granted the right to, at their pleasure, attend, vote and otherwise participate in any (with some minimal specified restrictions) meeting established by the Corporation. Only the President of the College and the Chairperson of the Board of Trustees may convene a meeting unprompted and unscheduled in the event of an confirmed emergency. The office of the presidency is filled by a majority vote by the Board of Trustees and the office of the presidency is vacated by the same. The president may not be removed for any reason whatsoever if a majority is not reached, formal notification is not presented to the incumbent, or a requested hearing is not granted. The president is the chief executive officer of the corporation and principal academic of the college. Only the President of the College may physically confer honorary degrees to recipients, no other member of the college, Board of Trustees, or Corporation is allowed to do so.

The executive compensation for the president as of 2013 included a base salary of $432,000, with overall compensation totaling $465,170. This make the president the second highest paid president of the CBB schools off of base pay, and the third highest paid president of the CBB schools off of overall compensation. The presidency of the college is afforded an official residence, and various other expense free benefits. The presidential salary is ranked as the 7th highest paid president (in base pay) in the New England Small College Athletic Conference.

Charter specifications

Rights and privileges 
The office of the presidency of Bates College is afforded certain rights and responsibilities, as well as some select privileges.It will be the duty of the President to be the chief executive and academic officer of the College and to cooperate with the other members of the Corporation and with the Faculty of the College in the formulation of the policies of the Corporation and to administer these policies when formulated, in accordance with such instructions as the Corporation as a whole, its Executive Committee, or its other committees, acting within their authority, will give the President. He/she will have such powers as are reasonable and necessary for the carrying out of such instructions. All officers of administration and members of the teaching faculty shall be responsible to the President of the College, or to such officers or officers as the President may designate, for the satisfactory performance of their respective duties as set forth by the President, or by such of cer or of cers as the President may designate, except as may otherwise be provided in the Charter, these Bylaws, or by the vote of the Trustees.The Office of the President, along with the Board of Trustees are immune from paying expenses incurred during the defense of the operational well-being of the college.[The President of the College when] acting within the scope of his or her employment in good faith and in a manner reasonably believed by such person to be lawful and in the best interest of the College, shall, in accordance with the provisions of Title 13-B of the Maine Revised Statutes, be indemnified against all expenses, including attorneys’ fees, judgments, nes and amounts paid in settlement, actually and necessarily incurred by action.

Signature 
The signature of the president is considered an essential execution in the operation of the college.The signature of the President or the Treasurer will be essential to the execution of all deeds and contracts to which the Corporation may become a party, except for those contracts involving less than an amount designated by the Board from time to time, and the signature of the President will be essential to the authentication of diplomas unless otherwise ordered by the Corporation.

State of the College 
It is mandated by both Board of Trustees and the Laws of the President and Trustees of Bates College that the incumbent president present an annual report detailing the current state of the institution.The President will present annually at a meeting of the Corporation a report on the state of the College, including in each such report such recommendations as to policies or changes thereof as he/she may consider desirable.

Ex officio membership 
The President is given the ex officio position of President of the Board of Trustees.The President is an ex officio member of the Board of Trustees and all committees, and may at his/her pleasure attend, participate and vote at the meetings of the Board of Trustees and its committees, except for meetings or portions of meetings designated by the Trustees or any committee thereof as "independent."

Tenure and term limits 
The President of Bates College serves at Trustees' Pleasure, meaning a set contractual term that is suspensive and expansive. Certain specifications of the Laws of the President and Trustees of Bates College bar the Board of Trustees from removing the incumbent for any reason.The term of the President's service will be described in a contract between the Board of Trustees and the President. Should the office of President become vacant or should the President be temporarily unable to perform the duties of his/her office, the Executive Committee will elect some person as Acting President, who will perform such duties of the presidency as they may determine until further action thereon is taken by the Board.

Corporation of the college 
With the office of the presidency, the Board of Trustees completes the Bates College Corporation which is given the right to adopt new rules, bylaws, and regulations as long as they stay within the jurisdiction of the legal system of the state of Maine. It is held directly responsible for the actions of the college with regard to finance and economic expenditure. The Corporation as a whole may establish new departments, majors, as well as schools within the college itself. It also reserves the right to hire and terminate professors, administrators, and staff. The employees of the college may be removed at any time, even faculty with academic tenure, if contractual destinations are faulted on or in any way disbanded. The Corporation also has the exclusive rights to establish the conferring of academic degrees. The members of the Board of Trustees, central administration, and the president are afforded certain and selected powers, privileges, rights and immunities through the Laws of the President and Trustees of Bates College, the highest ranking document in the Corporation of the college. The Corporation is to convene annually prior to the college's commencement in May to discuss the academic structuring of the following academic and calendar year.

Societies 
The central administration of Bates sanctions five giving and participant societies. They are, in alphabetical order;
 Benjamin Bates Society – Established in 2005: For those who donate more than $US 1 million dollars in their lifetime.
 Cheney Society – Established in 2005: For those who serve honorably on the Board of Trustees of Bates College.
 Garcelon Society – Established in 2005: For those donate to the Androscoggin Scholarship Fund.
 Mount David Society – Established in 2005: For those "who put the college first in their annual philanthropy."
 Phillips Society – Established in 1998: For those participate in legacy or estate donations.

See also 
 History of Bates College
 List of Bates College people

References

Citations

Further reading 

 Alfred, Williams Anthony. Bates College and Its Background. (1936) Online Deposit.
 Stuan, Thomas. The Architecture of Bates College. (2006)
 Chase, Harry. Bates College was named after Mansfield Man. (1878)
 Woz, Markus. Bates College – Traditionally Unconventional. (2002)
 Bates College Archives. Bates College Catalog. (1956–2017).  2017 Catalog.
 Bates College Archives. Maine State Seminary Records. Online Deposit.
 Bates College Archives. Bates College Oral History Project. Online Deposit.
 Clark, Charles E. Bates Through the Years: an Illustrated History. (2005) 
 Smith, Dana. Bates College – U. S. Navy V-12 Program Collection. (1943) Online Deposit.
 Eaton, Mabel. General Catalogue of Bates College and Cobb Divinity School. (1930)
 Larson, Timothy. Faith by Their Works: The Progressive Tradition at Bates College. (2005)
 Calhoun, Charles C. A Small College in Maine. p. 163. (1993)
 Johnnett, R. F. Bates Student: A Monthly Magazine. (1878)
 Phillips, F. Charles Bates College in Maine: Enduring Strength and Scholarship. Issue 245. (1952)
 Dormin J. Ettrude, Edith M. Phelps, Julia Emily Johnsen. French Occupation of the Ruhr: Bates College Versus Oxford Union Society of Oxford College. (1923)
 The Bates Student. The Voice of Bates College. (1873–2017)
 Emeline Cheney; Burlingame, Aldrich. The story of the life and work of Oren Burbank Cheney, founder and first president of Bates College. (1907) Online Version.

Direct notes 
 "Faith by Their Works: The Progressive Tradition at Bates College from 1855 to 1877", By Tomothy Larson (2005), Multi-source.

Bates College